Kamalapuram is a panchayat in Mulugu district in the Indian state of Telangana.

References

Villages in Mulugu district